Cedarville is a city in Crawford County, Arkansas, United States. It is part of the Fort Smith, Arkansas-Oklahoma Metropolitan Statistical Area. The population was 1,410 at the 2020 census.

History
Cedarville was platted in 1879. A post office has been in operation at Cedarville since 1872.

Geography
Cedarville is located in western Crawford County at  (35.582296, −94.360812), on the southern edge of Ozark National Forest. Arkansas Highway 59 runs through the city, leading north  towards Lincoln and south  to Van Buren, the Crawford County seat.

Demographics

As of the census of 2000, there were 1,133 people, 406 households, and 328 families residing in the city. The racial makeup of the city was 94.53% White, 0.18% Black or African American, 2.74% Native American, 0.26% Asian, 0.18% from other races, and 2.12% from two or more races. 0.97% of the population were Hispanic or Latino of any race.

There were 407 households, out of which 39.9% had children under the age of 18 living with them, 68.0% were married couples living together, 9.6% had a female householder with no husband present, and 19.0% were non-families. 15.8% of all households were made up of individuals, and 5.3% had someone living alone who was 65 years of age or older. The average household size was 2.79 and the average family size was 3.10.

In the city, the population was spread out, with 29.3% under the age of 18, 7.9% from 18 to 24, 32.1% from 25 to 44, 22.6% from 45 to 64, and 8.1% who were 65 years of age or older. The median age was 33 years. For every 100 females, there were 105.6 males. For every 100 females age 18 and over, there were 99.3 males.

The median income for a household in the city was $30,952, and the median income for a family was $33,409. Males had a median income of $30,385 versus $16,538 for females. The per capita income for the city was $14,346. About 10.7% of families and 15.8% of the population were below the poverty line, including 19.9% of those under age 18 and 19.4% of those age 65 or over. The median gross rent was $750/mo (2011) and estimated rent burden was 19.0%.

Education 
Public education for early childhood, elementary and secondary school students is primarily provided by the Cedarville School District, which leads to graduation from Cedarville High School. The school's mascot and athletic emblem is the Pirates with royal blue and gold as the school colors.

Notable person
Ruth Whitaker, Arkansas State Senator, lived in Cedarville.

References

Cities in Arkansas
Cities in Crawford County, Arkansas
Fort Smith metropolitan area